Řevnice is a town in Prague-West District in the Central Bohemian Region of the Czech Republic. It has about 3,600 inhabitants.

Geography

Most of the municipal territory lies in the Brdy Highlands, the northern part lies in the Hořovice Uplands. The town is situated on both banks of the river Berounka.

History
The first written mention of Řevnice is from 1253. At the end of the 19th century, the village was promoted to a market town, and in 1968, Řevnice was promoted to a town.

Transport
Řevnice is located on the railway line from Prague to Beroun.

Sights
The main landmark of Řevnice is the Church of Saint Maurice. There was two churches in the town: Romanesque church of Saint Maurice and Gothic church of the Virgin Mary. In the mid-18th century, both fell into disrepair and were therefore demolished. They were replaced by the current Church of Saint Maurice, built in the Baroque style in 1749–1753.

Notable people
Ludmila Vaňková (born 1927), writer and local politician
Martina Navratilova (born 1956), Czech-American tennis player; grew up here

References

External links

Cities and towns in the Czech Republic
Populated places in Prague-West District